The 2014 Shakey's V-League (SVL) season was the eleventh season of the Shakey's V-League. There were three indoor conferences for this season.

1st Conference

Preliminary round 
 Pool A

|}
 Pool B

|}

Quarterfinal round 
 Pool C

|}
 Pool D

|}

Final round 
 Ranking is based from the quarterfinals round.

Individual awards

Final standings

Open Conference

Preliminary round 

|}

Quarterfinals round 

  

|}

 Fourth-seed playoffs

|}

Final round 
 Ranking is based from the quarter finals round.
 All series are best-of-3

Individual awards

Final standings

Reinforced Conference

Women's division 

 Exhibition match

|}

Preliminary round 

|}

Final round 
 Battle for Bronze

|}

 Battle for Gold

|}

Individual awards

Final standings

Men's division

Preliminary round 

|}

Final round 
 Battle for Bronze

|}

 Battle for Gold

|}

Individual awards

Final standings

Broadcast partner 
 GMA News TV (local)
 GMA Pinoy TV (international)

References 

Shakey's V-League seasons
2014 in Philippine sport